Norre Port, also Norreport, city gate in Halmstad, Halland County, Sweden. Norre Port was completed in 1601 under the Danish king Christian IV.  This was part of the city's fortifications, which also included Halmstad Castle and the ramparts you can see remnants of in Norre Katt's park and by Charles XsIs's road. The gate, which leads to the street called , is angled in relation to this, a way to prevent shelling towards the city.

Modern times 
At the end of the 1870s, Halmstad City Council wanted to demolish Norre Port; it was then in poor condition and was considered an obstacle to traffic and the city's development. The then National Antiquarian Hans Hildebrand however, summarily rejected the City Council's request. Storgatan, now a pedestrian street, was until 1958 part of the Rikstvåan, which passed through Norre Port and Stora Torg, vis Österbro to reach Laholmsvägen. In 1929, Norre Port was provided with light signals that allowed traffic through in alternate directions; Halmstad's first traffic signals. Highway 2 passed through Norre Port until 1960. After the road was re-routed, the gate was closed to car traffic.

At the northern entrance to Halmstad is the so-called Karl XI:s cottage There, the king had to seek shelter one night on his way to Halmstad Castle, when the gate according to current rules was not opened after closing time. Norre Port, which is one of Sweden's few preserved city gates, underwent a renovation in 2005. In June 2007, Norre Port was declared a building monument. For a period, a gallery was housed in Norre Port - Gallery Norre Port.

Gallery

References

Sources 

 Erik Hägge. 1981. Norre Port Rediviva i krig och fred. Föreningen Gamla Halmstad 
 Swedish language page at Wikipedia (most of the content above, except the match case)
Match case brought to America in 1891 by Swante Martin (private collection)

City gates in Sweden
Halmstad
Buildings and structures in Halland County
Buildings and structures completed in 1601